Marcel Otto-Bruc (born 23 December 1922) is a French former sports shooter. He competed in the trap event at the 1960 Summer Olympics.

References

External links
 

1922 births
Possibly living people
French male sport shooters
Olympic shooters of France
Shooters at the 1960 Summer Olympics